Two Planets (lit. On Two Planets, 1897) is an influential science fiction novel postulating intelligent life on Mars by Kurd Lasswitz. It was first published in hardcover by Felber in two volumes in 1897; there have been many editions since, including abridgements by the author's son Erich Lasswitz (Cassianeum, 1948) and Burckhardt Kiegeland and Martin Molitor (Verlag Heinrich Scheffler, 1969). The 1948 abridgement, with "incidental parts" of the text taken from the 1969 version, was the basis of the first translation into English by Hans H. Rudnick, published in hardcover by Southern Illinois University Press in 1971. A paperback edition followed from Popular Library in 1976. The story covers topics like colonization, mutually assured destruction and clash of civilizations many generations before these topics came into politics.

Summary
A group of Arctic explorers seeking the North Pole find a Martian base there. The Martians can only operate in a polar region not because of climatic requirements, but because their spacecraft cannot withstand the rotation of the Earth at other latitudes. The aliens resemble Earth people in every respect except that they have much larger eyes, with which they can express more emotions. Their name for the inhabitants of Earth is "the small-eyed ones". Lasswitz's Martians are highly advanced, and initially peaceable; they take some of the explorers back with them to visit Mars dominated by canals. The Martian society seems to be enlightened, peaceful and highly advanced at first, but later the explorers learn about a plan to colonize Earth for farming solar power. In the following years, Mars subdues with ease every major government on Earth by force and diplomacy and promises to bring peace, education and prosperity for all. The situations start to look a lot like European colonization of third world countries before. Only parts of North America stay mostly independent for their low population density in the late 19th century. Over time, the Martian colonists become more arrogant towards the general population, which leads to uprising and atrocities from both sides with no chance of winning for the technologically inferior people from Earth, who form an organized planet-wide underground movement which operates from the shadows, steals technologies and unites the world in a final push against the Martians. In the final confrontation, both sides are faced with no way of winning the conflict as both sides have the power to annihilate the opposing infrastructure but not the opposing armies. In the end, an uneasy truce is made and honest talks start, giving Earth more freedom but still changed forever.

Mars as depicted by Lasswitz
Lasswitz hewed closely to the description by the astronomer Giovanni Schiaparelli of Martian channels (canali), and even closer to that of Percival Lowell, who viewed them as actual canals engineered by intelligent beings. Lasswitz's depiction is more reflective of the views of these astronomers than those of other science fiction stories of the era dealing with the planet, including H. G. Wells's The War of the Worlds, Edwin Lester Arnold's Lieut. Gullivar Jones: His Vacation and Edgar Rice Burroughs's tales of Barsoom, all of which were all written in the wake of Lasswitz's book.

Literary significance
This novel was popular in the Germany of its day. Wernher von Braun and Walter Hohmann were inspired by reading it as children just as Robert H. Goddard was by reading The War of the Worlds. While there was no English translation before 1971, Everett F. Bleiler notes that it likely influenced American genre SF via Hugo Gernsback: "Hugo Gernsback would have been saturated in Lasswitz's work, and Gernsback's theoretical position of technologically based liberalism and many of his little scientific crotchets resemble ideas in Lasswitz's work."

Reception
Theodore Sturgeon, reviewing that 1971 translation for The New York Times, found Two Planets "curious and fascinating . . . full of quaint dialogue, heroism, decorous lovemaking, and gorgeous gadgetry." Bleiler noted that the translated text was severely abridged, losing 40% of the original text; although the quality of the translation was good, he characterized the abridgment as "a bad emasculation . . . This loss of detail results in a skeletization that omits important background and weakens motivations and plot connections. Lester del Rey similarly dismissed the 1971 translation as a bowdlerization" which is "bad scholarship, . . . unfair to readers [and] grossly unfair to Lasswitz." Del Rey noted that the translation was based on a 1948 abridgment prepared by the author's son, with other modifications made by the translator.

References

1897 German novels
German science fiction novels
1897 science fiction novels
Novels set on Mars
Planetary romances
Novels about extraterrestrial life